Zintle Mpupha is a South African women's rugby union player and cricketer from Xesi, Eastern Cape, South Africa. She played cricket for Border cricket team and rugby for Border Bulldogs as well as the South Africa women's national rugby sevens team as a fly half.

Rugby 
Mpupha played rugby for Border Bulldogs. In 2013 she was first called up to the South Africa national women's rugby sevens team. However, due to studying for a degree at the University of Fort Hare, she stopped playing rugby sevens and started playing rugby union while at university. In 2016, after graduating, Mpupha returned to the South Africa rugby sevens team. In 2017, she was offered a professional contract with the South Africa women's national rugby sevens team. This meant that she had to move to Stellenbosch, Western Cape to train with the team which meant she was unable to  continue playing for either the Border cricket or rugby teams.

In 2021 she became the first South African to play in the Premier 15s after she signed with Exeter Chiefs Women.

Mpupha was selected to represent South Africa at the 2022 Rugby World Cup Sevens in Cape Town. She was also named in South Africa's women's fifteens team for the Rugby World Cup in New Zealand.

Cricket 
Mpupha started playing cricket and played for the Border cricket team's under-19s when she was 14 and made her cricket debut for the Border cricket team in 2011. Following this she was called up to the South Africa national women's under-19 cricket team.

References 

Living people
South Africa international rugby sevens players
South African women cricketers
Women of African descent
People from the Eastern Cape
Border Bulldogs players
Rugby union fly-halves
University of Fort Hare alumni
Place of birth missing (living people)
1993 births
South Africa international women's rugby sevens players